The following is a list of massacres that have occurred in Peru (numbers may be approximate):

References

Peru
Massacres

Internal conflict in Peru
Massacres